Adele was a steel screw steamer that was built in 1906 as a yacht. She was twice commissioned into the Royal Australian Navy (RAN), firstly as HMAS Franklin and later as HMAS Adele. She was wrecked at Port Kembla, New South Wales on 7 May 1943.

Design and construction
Adele was built in 1906 by Hawthorns & Co Ltd, Leith, Scotland as yard number 116. She was launched on 18 October 1906 and completed in November 1906.

Originally built as a yacht, she was later converted to steam power.

Propulsion

Official Number and Code Letters
Official numbers were a forerunner to IMO Numbers. In 1930, Adele had the UK Official Number 123022 and used the Code Letters HJRW.

Operational history
In 1915, Adele was purchased by the Australia Government for £21,500 from the estate of Henry Dutton of Kapunda, South Australia. On 14 September 1915 she was commissioned into the RAN as HMAS Franklin. HMAS Franklin served as a tender to the Royal Australian Naval College.

Franklin collided with the Sydney Harbour ferry, Vaucluse in 1916 injuring two passengers. Franklin's sharp bow smashed halfway through the wooden ferry's hull almost sinking her, however, the ferry was towed to nearby Garden Island where the dock's pumps kept her afloat.

Franklin was paid off on 31 March 1921 only to be recommissioned on 21 September.

Franklin was decommissioned on 18 September 1922 and gifted to the Administrator of Papua-New Guinea, serving there until 1929. By 1930, she had reverted to the name Adele and was owned by the Commonwealth Government of Australia and operated by the Department of Home & Territories. At the time she was homeported at Port Adelaide under the British Flag. In 1932, Adele was laid up at Rabaul. She was sold  for £1,652 on 7 December of that year to W L Buckland of Melbourne, Australia who refitted her as a private yacht and used her for cruising. Adele was later sold to C H Relph of Sydney and was laid up for some years at Rose Bay Port Jackson, Sydney.

On 24 October 1939, Adele was requisitioned by the Royal Australian Navy as HMAS Adele. She was armed with two .303-in Vickers machine guns and employed as an examination vessel.

Loss
On 7 May 1943, Adele struck the breakwater at Port Kembla and was subsequently declared a total loss. The wreck of Adele is protected under the New South Wales Heritage Act, 1977.

Legacy
Franklin is remembered in the naming of two other sail training yachts associated with the RAN College:
 a yacht in the 1960s and 1970s, which took part in several Sydney to Hobart races;
 a  Hunter yacht acquired in 2005.

References

Shipwrecks of the Illawarra Region
Merchant ships of Australia
Iron and steel steamships of Australia
Auxiliary ships of the Royal Australian Navy
1906 ships
Maritime incidents in May 1943
1901 – World War I ships of Australia
Interwar period ships of Australia
Ships built in Leith
Individual yachts